Kasper T. Toeplitz is a French composer and musician of Polish origin, born in 1960. He lives in Paris.

Biography 

He has worked with academic research organizations, such as GMEM, GRM, IRCAM, and Radio-France, as well  as with experimental musicians, such as Éliane Radigue, Zbigniew Karkowski, Dror Feiler, Tetsuo Furudate, Phill Niblock and Art Zoyd .
Citing Giacinto Scelsi and Iannis Xenakis as influences, his early work was mostly written for traditional instruments. He received several prizes and distinctions for these works: 1st prize in composition for orchestra at the festival of Besançon, 1st prize in the Opéra Autrement/Acanthes competition, Villa Médicis Hors-les-Murs in New York, prize Léonard de Vinci in San Francisco, Villa Kujoyama in Kyoto, and DAAD in Berlin. He has also written for his electric guitar orchestra, Sleaze Art. He then integrated computers into his work, via the programming language MAX.

His experimentation with computers continued, in 2003, with the creation of an instrument he calls the BassComputer, an electric bass with 5 fretted strings and 4 unfretted strings, as in the harp guitar. The instrument is intended to be interfaced with a computer. In 2004, he commissioned a piece from Eliane Radigue called Elemental II, which he interpreted for the BassComputer. This was an opportunity for him to set up his own label, ROSA (Recordings Of Sleaze Art). He later commissioned Phil Niblock’s Yam almost may (Touch Records TO59), and Dror Feiler’s Ousia. He also recorded Capture, one of his own compositions, on ROSA (Rosa#2, 2005), as well as ZKT, by Le Dépeupleur, a laptop duet, formed with Zbigniew Karkowski, and which has been together since 1999 (Rosa#3, 2006).

He has also written for dance (Myriam Gourfink, Loic Touzé, Olivia Granville, Emmanuelle Huynh, Hervé Robbe, Artefact, Christian Trouillas, Jean-Marc Matos), as well as theatre; he has always shown a great interest in literature (J'irai vers le nord, j'irai dans la nuit polaire, his first opera, was based on Sylvia Plath's texts, as was Great Expectations on Kathy Acker's texts; Ruine was composed on a François Bon text), and more recently he has developed "combined" pieces, mixing light and/or video images (K_apture, for computer solo, on Dominik Barbier's videos).

In 2007 he created, with Eryck Abecassis and Wilfried Wendling, KERNEL, a computer ensemble devoted to interpretation, live stricto sensu (without any samples or sequences), of electronic music compositions.

Press
 About The Deep, a piece written by Kasper T. Toeplitz for KERNEL in 2008, Dan Warburton, for Paris Transatlantic Magazine :
"The Deep is the latest composition - and we're definitely talking composition here: you can even check out the score online at the sleazeart website, and very interesting it is too - by Kasper Toeplitz for KERNEL, his laptop trio with Eryck Abecassis and Wilfried Wendling. There's plenty of information about the group and their instrumentation (i.e. software, for the most part) at the sleazeart site, but no amount of background reading and scrutiny of KTT's pdfs (you'll need a smattering of French) can prepare you for the impressive 59'33" of The Deep. Since Paul D. Miller and his chums made Xenakis suddenly hip a few years back, far too many musicians have been quick to claim some kind of Xenakis street cred, but very few compositions pack the clout of Bohor or La Légende d'Eer. Happy to report that The Deep is one of them. Toeplitz has a real feel not only for the large form - which is not simply a question of taking a short form and stretching it out: ask Eliane Radigue, who worked closely with KTT on the realisation of her Elemental II back in 2004 - but for the surface and texture of the sounds he and his playing partners choose to articulate it. Any self-respecting fan of Xenakis, Radigue or EAI for that matter (putting any anti-composer prejudice aside) should check this splendid work out at the earliest opportunity."

 About ZKT, the second release by Le Dépeupleur, K.T. Toeplitz and Z. Karkowski laptop duet, Keith Moliné, in The Wire (May 2006, "Outer Limits") :
"Le Dépeupleur is the name by which the ongoing collaboration between veteran sound artists Toeplitz and Karkowski has been known since the late 90s. in a field dominated by solo performers, both do much of their best work in partnership with others: Toeplitz has performed with Art Zoyd, among others, while Karkowski has released albums with such luminaries of noise and non-noise as Merzbow and The Hafler Trio.It's the latter's recent work that this album most resembles: another single 50 minute track that reveals itself steadily over its first 30 minutes and then recedes slowly into silence, the duo managing to imbue their minimalism with a sense of geniue mystery. It's a challenging listen and though it makes few concessions to conventional notions of beauty, it never alienates. Oscillating feedback tones, blurred at the edges by a spray of soft white noise, are woven into the tough gossamer thread that spins out of the piece's duration. Le Dépeupleur demands attention and rewards it correspondingly."

 About Elemental II, a piece commissioned to Eliane Radigue, played on the BassComputer and released by K.T. Toeplitz on r.o.s.a, 2005 (this CD is in the 50 records of the year chosen by The Wire), Dan Warburton, in The Wire :
"Commissioned and first performed in January 2004 by bassist Kasper T. Toeplitz, Elemental II is the inaugural release of Toeplitz's label r.o.s.a., which stands for Recordings Of Sleaze Art - though sleazy is about the last adjective in the world one would choose to describe the music of Eliane Radigue. Often misleadingly associated with the musique concrète establishment through her work with Pierre Henry, the mystery and magic of Radigue's music occupies a twilight zone of minimalism between the static drones of Young, Conrad and Niblock and the gradual processes of Reich and Glass. It's forever on the move, albeit very slowly - speed it up fivefold in some music software and you'll be surprised - but constructed so meticulously that it somehow slips of time altogether. Based on an earlier work dating from 1968, Elemental II is devised as an evocation of the five elements (earth, water, fire, air and ether), its 50 minutes falling into five dovetailing sections of roughly equal length. The beginning of each new section is clearly perceptible, but elsewhere the slow changes characteristic of her music seem to take place under the surface of the music, as it were. It's very much a native source emerging freely from the earth (the composer's descriptions would be twee if they weren't so spot on), with change perceived as having taken place than taking place. however many times you listen - and this is music you will return to on many occasions - you'll probably never quite figure out how she did it. As elusive as the music itself is Toeplitz's own contribution, as nothing resembles the electric bass he's credited as playing."

Several works
Nature Morte : for orchestra, 1988.
Zéline : for violoncello solo, 1989.
Paysage foudroyé : for electric bass solo, 1989.
J'irai vers le nord, j'irai dans la nuit polaire : opera based on Sylvia Plath's texts, (1st prize in the «Opéra Autrement» competition, Centre Acanthes), 1989.
Lhow : for orchestra (1st prize in composition for orchestra at the festival of Besançon), 1990.
Anachorète : for soprano saxophone solo, 1991.
Memory-Cendres : for a woman's voice, percussions, clarinet and double bass, 1992.
Sthill : for 8 saxophones, 1992.
Blind Sucht :for 9 instruments and electroacoustic dispositive, 1993.
Ephémérides : for 9 instruments, 1995.
Siyahi : for orchestra, 1996.
Stances d'orchestre : for orchestra, 1997.
Je est une autre : for voice, violoncello, clarinet, double bass and percussions, 1997.
Ruine :for orchestra and soprano solo, on a François Bon text, 1998.
Biel : for orchestra and samplers, 2000.
Appars/Vague de pas : for small orchestra, electronic keyboard and percussions, 2001.
Battling Siki : opera for strings, electronics instruments, theremin, percussions and computers, 2003.
Froz#5 : for tubax and computer, 2003.
Contraindre, for theremin (Laurent Dailleau), chor. Myriam Gourfink, 2004.
Capture : for three dancers/musicians via moving capture by video, 2005 (CD: Rosa #2).
Unfinished Metal Waves : for big tam (Didier Casamitjana, Jérôme Mimetic Soudan) and computer, 2006.
This is my House :  for saxophone (Ulrich Krieger) and computer, chor. Myriam Gourfink, 2006.
Champ des Larmes : spectacle with Art Zoyd (written with Gérard Hourbette), 2006.
 Lärmesmitte : for BassComputer, 2006.
Dust Reconstructions : piece for a nonfixed instrumentarium; in its first execution, for hurdy-gurdy  (Stevie Wishart), saxophone (Ulrich Krieger), BassComputer (himself)  and computers (all of them), 2007.
Kernel#2 : KERNEL's first creation, 2007.
 The Deep : for and by KERNEL, 2008.
Perdu : Mystery Bass - Solo Electric Bass | Published by: Radical Matters - Editions / Label. 2012.

See also 
 Gérard Hourbette
 Thierry Zaboitzeff

References

External links
 Sleaze Art: KTT website
 KTT on myspace
 KTT on Metamkine
 KERNEL on MySpace

1960 births
Living people
French composers
French male composers